"Fool to Cry" is a ballad by English rock band the Rolling Stones from their 1976 album Black and Blue.

The song was written by Mick Jagger and Keith Richards. Mick Taylor had just left the band and the Stones were left without a lead guitarist. The recording of Black and Blue acted as a sort of audition for new guitarists, which led to session man Wayne Perkins playing guitar on this track. Jagger plays electric piano and Nicky Hopkins performs regular piano on the track, with Hopkins also playing the string synthesizer.

Released as the lead single off Black and Blue in 1976, "Fool to Cry" reached No. 6 on the UK Singles Chart and No. 10 on the U.S. Billboard Hot 100. The full track lasts just over five minutes, whereas the single (as well as edits, this also fades out at the end) lasts just over four minutes.   

Cash Box called this "a departure for the Stones," saying that "the beat is relaxed, vocals are laid over a foundation of Fender Rhodes and guitar, all played with funky style" and also praised Jagger's falsetto vocals and Richards' "searing guitar riffs." Record World said that "this ballad rivals 'Angie' in its soul drenching qualities" and noted that there were "superb performances all around."

"Fool to Cry" was the only track from Black and Blue to appear on the Stones' career-spanning greatest hits albums Forty Licks in 2002 and GRRR! in 2012.

Chart performance

Weekly charts

Year-end charts

Covers
Lena Dunham, creator and star of HBO’s Golden Globe-winning show Girls, commissioned Tegan and Sara to cover the Rolling Stones' "Fool to Cry" for the show's official soundtrack. American singer and songwriter Taylor Dayne covered the song for her 2008 studio album Satisfied.

References

External links

1976 singles
1976 songs
1970s ballads
British soul songs
Music videos directed by Bruce Gowers
Song recordings produced by Jagger–Richards
Songs written by Jagger–Richards
The Rolling Stones songs